Ulrich "Ulli" Libor  (born 27 March 1940) is a German sailor.  He won a silver medal in the Flying Dutchman Class at the 1968 Summer Olympics and a bronze medal at the 1972 Summer Olympics.

References 
 Profile at sports-reference.com

1940 births
Living people
People from Kędzierzyn-Koźle
Sportspeople from Opole Voivodeship
People from the Province of Silesia
German male sailors (sport)
Sailors at the 1968 Summer Olympics – Flying Dutchman
Sailors at the 1972 Summer Olympics – Flying Dutchman
Olympic sailors of West Germany
Olympic bronze medalists for West Germany
Olympic medalists in sailing

Medalists at the 1972 Summer Olympics
Medalists at the 1968 Summer Olympics
Olympic silver medalists for West Germany